Torsken is a village in Senja Municipality in Troms og Finnmark county, Norway.  It is located along the Torskenfjorden on the southwestern part of the  island of Senja.  The Skipsfjorden branches off the main fjord just east of the village.  The historic Torsken Church is located in this village.  There is one road into the village, from the municipal centre of Gryllefjord.

References

Villages in Troms
Senja